Mariša Golob  (born 15 May 1990) is the most successful and decorated female in Slovenian powerlifting history.

Career 
Throughout her younger years Mariša Golob competed in karate, artistic gymnastics and basketball. In 2011, she joined a local gym and met her current coach Erni Gregorčič. He saw her potential and introduced her to powerlifting.  In 2012, she began to compete internationally and since then won more than 25 World and European Championship titles in powerlifting, bench press, push&pull and deadlift.

She is the current national, European and world record holder in many different powerlifting federations (GPA, WUAP, IPO, WPA).
She is participating and competing in two powerlifting federations, WUAP and GPA.

Personal records 
Official powerlifting competition records (raw - sleeves):

Official powerlifting competition records (raw - wraps):

Official powerlifting competition records (equipped):

Official bench press competition record (raw):

Official bench press competition record (equipped):

Official push&pull competition records (raw) :

Official deadlift competition record (raw) :

National, European and World records

National records 

Mariša is the current Slovenian powerlifting, bench press, push&pull and deadlift record holder in −56 kg weight class in junior and open category.

European records 

Mariša holds the current GPA European record powerlifting in −56 kg, open category.

World records 

At the moment Mariša is a GPA push&pull World record holder in −56 kg, open category and bench press World record holder in −56 kg, junior category.
She is also the current IPO World record holder in equipped bench press in −56 kg weight class, both junior and open category. In WUAP federation she is also the holder of the raw powerlifting World record in −56 kg and -52 kg weight class, open category, equipped bench press −56 kg weight class, open category and equipped bench press −60 kg weight class, junior category. In the same federation she also holds equipped powerlifting World records in both −56 kg and −60 kg weight class, junior category. In May 2018 Mariša became squat (full meet), bench press (full meet) and total WPA world record holder in open -56kg class.

World and European Championships

References

1990 births
Living people
Sportspeople from Ljubljana
Slovenian powerlifters
Slovenian sportswomen
Female powerlifters